François-Henri de Franquetot de Coigny, 2ieme duc de Coigny (28 March 1737 – 19 May 1821) was a Marshal of France.

Early life
He was the son of Jean, Marquis de Coigny (1702–1748) and the grandson of François de Franquetot, 1er duc de Coigny, another Marshal of France. When he was eleven, his father was killed in a duel and at age fifteen, young de Coigny entered the musketeers.

Career
De Coigny first served in the Seven Years' War where as a cavalry general he took part in the conquest of Hanover.  Having fought at Hastenbeck and Minden, he transferred to the army of the Count of Clermont under whom he served in the Battle of Krefeld.

Promoted to Colonel General of the Dragoons in 1771, the following year he was appointed Governor of Cambrai. In 1787 he was made a peer of France. When the French Revolution broke out De Coigny decided to emigrate. In 1791 he joined the émigré army with whom he served against the French Republic during the early stages of the French Revolutionary Wars. He commanded the Maison du Roi until its disbandment in 1792, after which he was charged by the Count of Provence with several diplomatic missions. 

De Coigny entered Portuguese service thereafter and, following the abdication of Napoléon I of France, ultimately returned to France. From 1816 to 1821 he was Governor of Les Invalides. In 1816, De Coigny was made a Marshal of France; he died five years later.

Personal life
De Coigny was married to Marie Jeanne de Bonnevie. Together, they were the parents of a son and daughter:

 François Marie Casimir de Franquetot, marquis de Coigny (1756–1816), who married Louise Gabrielle de Conflans (1743–1825), a daughter of Louis de Brienne de Conflans d'Armentières.
 Jeanne-Françoise-Antoinette "Fanny" Franquetot de Coigny (1778–1807), who married Horace Sébastiani (later the French Minister of Foreign Affairs), in 1806. She died in childbirth while in Constantinople in 1807, a few days before Sultan Selim III was deposed. Sébastiani later married Aglaé-Angélique-Gabrielle de Gramont, the widow of Russian General Count Alexander Davidoff and a daughter of Héraclius, duc de Gramont.

De Coigny died on 19 May 1821.

Descendants
Through his only daughter, he was a grandfather of Françoise, duchesse de Praslin, who was believed to have been murdered by her husband, Charles de Choiseul, Duke of Praslin in 1847. While awaiting trial, the Duke committed suicide, events which contributed to the French Revolution of 1848.

Through his son, he was a grandfather of Augustin Louis Joseph Casimir Gustave de Franquetot, Duc de Coigny and Antoinette Jeanne Françoise de Franquetot de Coigny.

References

1737 births
1821 deaths
Marshals of France
Place of birth missing
Peers created by Louis XVI
Members of the Chamber of Peers of the Bourbon Restoration
Dukes of Coigny